Zaz may refer to:

Places
İzbırak, Midyat, or Zaz, a village in Turkey
Zaz-e Gharbi Rural District, an administrative subdivision of Iran
Zaz-e Sharqi Rural District, an administrative subdivision of Iran
IATA airport code for Zaragoza Airport, Spain

Music
 Zaz (singer), stage name of French singer-songwriter Isabelle Geffroy
 "Zaz Turned Blue", a song from the 1983 Was (Not Was) album Born to Laugh at Tornadoes
 Zaz (album)

Others
ZAZ, a Ukrainian automobile manufacturer
Zucker, Abrahams and Zucker, an American comedy film-making trio
ZAZ (TV channel), a defunct children-oriented cable channel from Mexico
Zaz, a former Brazilian Internet service provider now part of Terra Networks
Zaz (video game), Zaz ain't Z is an arcade action think-fast game

See also
Zazz